Victor Lind may refer to:
 Victor Lind (artist)
 Victor Lind (footballer)